Dibernardia poecilopogon is a species of snake in the family Colubridae. The species is native to Brazil, Uruguay, and Argentina.

References

Dibernardia
Snakes of South America
Reptiles described in 1863
Reptiles of Uruguay
Reptiles of Brazil]
Reptiles of Argentina]
Taxa named by Edward Drinker Cope